Tsukasa, most often written 司 or by its hiragana つかさ is a Japanese given name and surname, and can also be written with other kanji, such as 官, 官, 首, 宰 or 吏, or written in katakana, ツカサ and may refer to:

Females:
, Japanese actress
Tsukasa Aoi (葵 つかさ, born 1990), Japanese gravure idol
Tsukasa Fujimoto, Japanese professional wrestler and actress
, Japanese judoka

Males:
, Japanese politician
Tsukasa Dokite, animator and character designer
Tsukasa Endo (born 1961), Japanese long-distance runner
, Japanese sumo wrestler
, Japanese writer
Tsukasa Hirano (平野 司, born 1983), Japanese triathlete
Tsukasa Hojo, Japanese manga artist and writer
, Japanese footballer
, Japanese politician 
, Japanese politician
Tsukasa Kobonoki (born 1991), Japanese footballer
Tsukasa Kotobuki, Japanese character designer
, Japanese footballer
, Japanese footballer
, Japanese footballer
, Japanese footballer
Tsukasa Saito, Japanese comedian
Shinobu Tsukasa, Japanese yakuza lord
Tsukasa Sonobe Japanese rower
, Japanese footballer
, Japanese video game composer and sound effects designer
Tsukasa Umesaki, Japanese footballer
Tsukasa Watanabe, Japanese golfer
Tsukasa (born 1985), Japanese drummer

Fictional characters
Tsukasa (.hack), a character in the anime series .hack//Sign
Tsukasa Ayatsuji, a character in the video game Amagami
Tsukasa Domyoji, a character in the manga series Hana Yori Dango
Tsukasa Hiiragi, a character in the manga series Lucky Star
Tsukasa Shishio, a character in the manga and anime series Dr. Stone
Tsukasa Kadoya, a character in the television series Kamen Rider Decade
Tsukasa Mizugaki, a character in the television series Plastic Memories
Tsukasa Myojin, a character in the television series Kaitou Sentai Lupinranger VS Keisatsu Sentai Patranger.
Tsukasa Nishino, a character in the manga series Ichigo 100%
Tsukasa Yugi, a character in the manga and anime series Jibaku Shounen Hanako-kun
Tsukasa, a dog from the horror video game Forbidden Siren 2
Tsukasa Yuzaki, a character in the manga and anime series Tonikaku Kawaii
Tsukasa Tenma, a character in the game "Project Sekai", a member of the WonderlandsxShowtime unit
Tsukasa Ebisu, a character in the Revue Starlight franchise

Japanese unisex given names